Teratauxta is a genus of moths of the family Crambidae. It contains only one species, Teratauxta paradoxa, which is found on Sumatra.

References

Natural History Museum Lepidoptera genus database

Acentropinae
Crambidae genera